The following is a list of association football managers who have won Iraqi Premier League, the top level of the Iraqi football league system, since its establishment in 1974.

Winning managers

Key

Multiple winners

Winners by nationality

References

Iraqi Premier League managers
Iraqi Premier League